Kikan may refer to:
Kikan, Iran, a village in Kurdistan Province, Iran
Tokumu Kikan（機関）, a Japanese World War II intelligence agency
Organization XIII, a fictional organization in the Kingdom Hearts video game series